Aitor is a Basque masculine given name, created by Agosti Xaho for a Basque ancestral patriarch descending from the Biblical Tubal in his work "The Legend of Aitor" (published in French in the journal Ariel, 1845).
Koldo Mitxelena believes that Xaho created it from the Souletin Basque expression aitoren semeak or aitonen semeak ("gentry", literally "sons of good fathers" interpreted as "sons of Aitor", aita meaning "father" and on meaning "good")
After Xaho, it was popularized by the Spanish-language novel Amaya o los vascos en el siglo VIII.
Nowadays it is a common name among Basque males.

People with the name Aitor include:

 Aitor 'Txiki' Beguiristain (born 1964), Spanish retired footballer
 Aitor Embela
 Aitor Galdós (born 1979), Spanish road bicycle racer
 Aitor González (born 1975), Spanish retired road bicycle racer
 Aitor Hernández (born 1982), Spanish racing cyclist
 Aitor Karanka (born 1973), Spanish retired footballer who mainly played with Athletic Bilbao and Real Madrid
 Aitor Larrazábal (born 1971), Spanish retired footballer who played for Athletic Bilbao
 Aitor López Rekarte (born 1975), Spanish retired footballer who mainly played for Real Sociedad
 Aitor Núñez (born 1987), Spanish footballer, currently playing for Cádiz CF
 Aitor Ocio (born 1976), Spanish retired footballer, well known for playing with Athletic Bilbao and Sevilla FC
 Aitor Osa (born 1973), Spanish retired road bicycle racer
 Aitor Pérez (born 1977), Spanish road bicycle racer
 Aitor Ramos (born 1985), Spanish footballer, currently playing for Arenas Getxo
 Aitor Tornavaca Fernández (born 1976), Spanish footballer, currently playing for Real Avilés
 Aitor Olomo FCB (born 1979), Spanish Footballer, currently Technical Director at Barca Academy Delhi/NCR

References

Basque masculine given names
 Aïtor. Légende cantabre / Aitor. - Leyenda cántabra / Aitor. - Kantabriar kondaira